The Neuer Börneplatz memorial in Frankfurt am Main commemorates the Jewish community of Frankfurt that was destroyed in the Holocaust. It was opened to the public on the 16 June 1996.

The central element is the frieze on the outer wall of the Old Jewish Cemetery Battonnstraße, which with 11,957 memorial blocks pays individual tribute to the victims of the Schoa from Frankfurt. Further components of the memorial commemorate the eventful history of the former Frankfurter Judengasse, the Börneplatz and the destruction of Jewish life in the city. The architecture was designed by Wandel Lorch Architekten.

State 
The memorial is located in the eastern inner city of Frankfurt, between the oldest Jewish cemetery in Frankfurt and the rear of the building for the former Frankfurter Stadtwerke on Kurt-Schumacher-Straße, today the planning department of the city of Frankfurt am Main. The complex is accessible from Battonnstrasse, past the entrance to the Museum Judengasse and from Rechneigrabenstrasse.

Planning 

In 1985 the city of Frankfurt am Main announced a competition for the development of the Börneplatz. A customer centre of the municipal utilities was to be built here, whose offices had previously been distributed throughout the city. The planning was entrusted to the Swiss architect Ernst Gisel. At the same time, the city council and magistrate decided to transform the Börneplatz into a "New Börneplatz" with the new building. The Jewish community suggested that a memorial be erected to commemorate the deportations of Frankfurt Jews between 1941 and 1945.

During the excavation work for the customer centre, the planners came across house foundations and two Mikvehs of Frankfurt's Judengasse, the former Jewish ghetto. Since the city government under Lord Mayor Wolfram Brück (CDU) was partial to the new building of the municipal utilities, all remains of the Wall were removed. This led to fierce public protest in the summer of 1987. There were demonstrations against the removal of the archaeological finds; the construction site was often occupied by Demonstrators. The Börneplatz conflict finally ended with a compromise: the foundations of five houses in the former Judengasse, two ritual baths and other archaeological remains were restored to their original location, but renewed lower than originally, and still form the centre of the Museum Judengasse, which opened in 1992. The Börneplatz conflict therefore formed a deep cut within the cities policy of commemoration.

Parallel to the construction work, the competition for the "Neuer Börneplatz Memorial" was launched. 249 applicants submitted their works. Since the jury initially did not want to award a 1st prize, the results were presented and discussed again in public. In the end, the architects Wandel Hoefer Hirsch Lorch were selected as the winners of the competition.

Description 
The memorial consists of several elements: In the centre of the square on Rechneigrabenstraße stands a stone cube made up of the remains of the foundations of the former ghetto. It is surrounded by a plane grove. The ground of the square is covered with grey gravel stones. The ground plan of the Börneplatz Synagogue, built in 1882 and devastated in 1938 during the November Pogrom, is marked by metal rails on the ground. A commemorative plaque for the destroyed synagogue was installed on the rear wall of the Stadtwerke building. It had already been ceremoniously unveiled by the US military government in an act of commemoration on 20 March 1946, but was not installed in the right place at the time. The inscription reads:
The adjacent Old Jewish Cemetery received a new gate. It consists of two modern metal gates on which Beth Ha'Chaim ("House of Life") is written in Hebrew letters.

Five street signs also point to Rechneigrabenstraße, referring to the changing names of squares since the end of the 19th century: The square partly overlaps with the Judenmarkt, which existed from the 16th century onwards. On the occasion of Ludwig Börne's 100th birthday, it was renamed Börneplatz. Because of the Jewish name bearer it was named after the nearby Dominican monastery in Dominikanerplatz during the National Socialism. At the suggestion of the Frankfurt historian Paul Arnsberg, the square was given its old name again in 1978. Since the 1990s it has been called Neuer Börneplatz.

The centre of the memorial is the frieze on the outer wall of the Old Jewish Cemetery, which commemorates Frankfurt Jews who were murdered during the Nazi era or died as a result of persecution. By the time the memorial was inaugurated, 11,134 people had been identified whose biographical data can be read on metal blocks. Their shape symbolizes graves. Visitors to the memorial can place small stones here according to Jewish mourning rites. In addition to short biographies and photographs, the names can also be found in the publicly accessible "Neuer Börneplatz Memorial Database", which was initiated by the Jewish Museum Frankfurt and can be used in the Museum Judengasse. The searches for the database also enabled subsequent corrections to be made to the memorial. The name frieze on the southern cemetery wall was extended by 823 name blocks in 2010.

See also 

 Memorial Neuer Börneplatz Official website
 Memorial Neuer Börneplatz database

References 

History of Frankfurt
Holocaust memorials in Germany